"Somethin' Else" is a song by the rockabilly musician Eddie Cochran, co-written by his girlfriend Sharon Sheeley and his elder brother Bob Cochran, and released in 1959. It has been covered by a wide range of artists, including Johnny Hallyday, Led Zeppelin, and the Sex Pistols.

Original version
Bob Cochran, Eddie's brother, and Sharon Sheeley share the song writing credit along with Eddie. The first-person lyrics describe how the singer wants a convertible car he cannot afford, and a girl who he fears will not go out with him. But in the end, by saving money, he is able to buy an older car, and works up the confidence to ask the girl out.

Musicians on the session were: Vocals/Guitar: Eddie Cochran,  Drums: Gene Reggio, Electric Bass: Don Myers. The song peaked at No. 22 on the UK Singles Chart, and reached No. 58 on the Billboard Hot 100 in the U.S.

Renditions
French singer Johnny Hallyday recorded a version titled "Elle est terrible". A live version, recorded at the Olympia Hall in Paris, was first released in 1962 and spent one week at the top position on the singles sales chart in France (from December 15 to 21). In Wallonia (French Belgium), it spent 28 weeks on the chart, peaking at No. 4.

It was a part of The Move's repertoire in the late sixties, featuring on the EP Something Else from The Move recorded in London's Marquee Club in 1968.

The Sex Pistols recorded a version of "Something Else" for the album The Great Rock 'n' Roll Swindle (1979). The double A-sided single was credited to "Sex Pistols: vocals Sid Vicious" and was released three weeks after Vicious died. It peaked at No. 3 on the UK Singles Chart. The second side of the single was "Friggin' in the Riggin'", also credited to "Sex Pistols: vocals Steve Jones".

Canadian band Teenage Head recorded a version of "Somethin' Else" for their 1980 album Frantic City.

English hard rock band UFO covered the song for their 1982 album Mechanix.

References

1959 singles
1979 singles
Eddie Cochran songs
Johnny Hallyday songs
Sex Pistols songs
Songs written by Sharon Sheeley
Liberty Records singles
Virgin Records singles
1959 songs